A constitutional referendum was held in Madagascar on 19 August 1992. The new constitution created a semi-presidential system and a Senate. It was approved by 73% of voters, with a 65% turnout.

Results

References

Referendums in Madagascar
1992 referendums
1992 in Madagascar
Constitutional referendums in Madagascar
August 1992 events in Africa